Leonard Charles Bowkett (6 September 1906 – February 1976) was an English rugby union, and professional rugby league footballer who played in the 1920s and 1930s, and coached rugby league in the 1930s.

Background

Playing career

International honours
Len Bowkett took place in a trial match for England (RU) circa-1926, and won a cap for England (RL) while at Huddersfield in 1932 against Wales.

Challenge Cup Final appearances
Len Bowkett played left-, i.e. number 4, was captain, man of the match, and scored three penalties, and two conversions in Huddersfield's 21–17 victory over Warrington in the 1932–33 Challenge Cup Final during the 1932–33 season at Wembley Stadium, London on Saturday 6 May 1933, receiving the trophy from Edward, Prince of Wales.

County Cup Final appearances
Len Bowkett played left-, i.e. number 4, and scored a goal in Huddersfield's 2–10 defeat by Leeds in the 1930–31 Yorkshire County Cup Final during the 1930–31 season at Thrum Hall, Halifax on Saturday 22 November 1930, played left-, i.e. number 4, and scored a goal in the 4–2 victory over Hunslet in the 1931–32 Yorkshire County Cup Final during the 1931–32 season at Headingley Rugby Stadium, Leeds on Saturday 21 November 1931.

Club career
Len Bowkett played two matches while on loan from Huddersfield to Batley in April 1936; the 12–9 victory over Huddersfield at Mount Pleasant, Batley on Saturday 11 April 1936, and the 7–10 defeat by Leigh at Mather Lane (adjacent to the Bridgewater Canal), Leigh on Easter Monday 13 April 1936.

Genealogical information
Len Bowkett's marriage to Jessie (née Taylor) was registered during first ¼ 1926 in Coventry district. They had children; June Bowkett (birth registered during second ¼ 1926 in Coventry district), John L. Bowkett (birth registered during third ¼ 1931 in Coventry district), Roland G. Bowkett (birth registered during third ¼ 1937 in Coventry district),

References

External links
(archived by web.archive.org) Huddersfield's Hall of Fame
Goal Kickers
Stanley Hawksworth recalls Huddersfield's 1933 Wembley win over Warrington
Auction of Fartown legend Len Bowkett’s medals fetches £2,300
Richard Bowkett reunited with grandfather’s Fartown memorabilia
Search for "Len Bowkett" at britishnewspaperarchive.co.uk

1906 births
1976 deaths
Batley Bulldogs players
Coventry R.F.C. players
England national rugby league team players
English rugby league coaches
English rugby league players
English rugby union players
Huddersfield Giants captains
Huddersfield Giants players
Keighley Cougars players
Publicans
Rugby league centres
Rugby league five-eighths
Rugby league fullbacks
Rugby league players from Coventry
Rugby union players from Coventry